Wilmer Lower Stultz (April 11, 1900 – July 1, 1929) was an aviator who made the first non-stop flight between New York City and Havana, Cuba. He died in a crash in 1929.

Biography

He was born in Williamsburg, Pennsylvania, on April 11, 1900.

Stultz joined the United States Army Air Force on 22 August 1917 and was assigned to the 634th Aero Supply Squadron, reaching the rank of Sergeant. He was discharged on 31 March 1919. Stultz then joined the United States Naval Air Service in December that year, training at Pensacola, Florida. He served at Hampton Roads, Virginia, testing the F5L flying boat.

He married Mildred Botts of Middletown, Pennsylvania, on August 4, 1919.

On March 5, 1928, Stultz, Oliver Colin LeBoutillier, and Mabel Boll on an improvised seat, made the first non-stop flight in the Columbia between New York City and Havana, Cuba (c. 1300 mi.).

Stultz was the pilot of the Fokker Trimotor "Friendship" on June 18, 1928, when Amelia Earhart became the first woman passenger to cross the Atlantic Ocean by airplane.

Stultz died on July 1, 1929, after he crashed while intoxicated at Roosevelt Field in Mineola, New York. Two passengers were also killed. He was buried in the Presbyterian Cemetery in Williamsburg, Pennsylvania.

Legacy
Stultz Field in Tipton, Pennsylvania, was named in his honor.

References

1900 births
1929 deaths
Aviators from Pennsylvania
Aviators killed in aviation accidents or incidents in the United States
People from Blair County, Pennsylvania